DS Penske (formerly Dragon Racing) is an American auto racing team that is involved in many areas of motorsport. Dragon Racing was founded in 2007 by Jay Penske and Stephen J. Luczo. The team competed in the IndyCar Series from 2007 until 2014, and in 2014 Dragon Racing became one of the founding Formula E teams. It currently competes under the name DS Penske, having been known as Dragon / Penske Autosport between 2020 and 2022 and GEOX Dragon between 2014 and 2019.

Notable Dragon Racing drivers include Jérôme d'Ambrosio, Sébastien Bourdais, Loïc Duval, Ryan Briscoe, Paul Tracy and Tomas Scheckter.

History

Luczo Dragon Racing
The team debuted as Luczo Dragon Racing in 2007. The team fielded a one-off entry at the 2007 Indianapolis 500 with driver Ryan Briscoe. Jay Penske and Stephen J. Luczo were co-owners. Briscoe qualified 7th and finished 5th at Indianapolis 500. The car was notable for being painted in a "retro" paint schemes to resemble Rick Mears' 1988 Indianapolis 500 winning car, with Symantec software as the lead sponsor.

Luczo Dragon ran a six-race schedule in 2008 including the Indianapolis 500 with IndyCar veteran Tomas Scheckter, this time without support or cars from Penske Racing. While qualifying well, qualifying 3rd and leading numerous laps at the Indy 500 before being knocked out by mechanical trouble.

The team expanded to a full-time entrant in 2009, fielding 2008 Indy Lights champion Raphael Matos. Matos and the Dragon Racing team went on to win the Rookie of Year honors in 2009 and scored multiple top-10 finishes.

Dragon Racing
In February 2011, Jay Penske re-branded the team as Dragon Racing in April 2011 and jointly announced that Paul Tracy had signed a five-race deal to compete for the team. Additionally the team entered two cars in the Indy 500 for drivers Scott Speed and Ho-Pin Tung. Tung crashed his car during qualifying and suffered a concussion crashing with only two corners to go, Tung would have qualified in the top 5. Scott Speed was unable to get his car up to speed, and the team let him go during practice.

In January 2012, Dragon Racing had operations in Indianapolis and Los Angeles. It entered two cars in the 2012 IndyCar Series season; one driven by Katherine Legge, and the other driven by four-time Champ Car champion Sébastien Bourdais, but on June 1, 2012, it was revealed that they would reduce operations to just 1 team with Bourdais driving the street courses and Legge on the ovals. Bourdais finished 25th in points with a best finish of fourth. Legge finished 26th with a best finish of 9th.

On February 12, 2013, it was announced that Sebastián Saavedra would be joining the team for the 2013 season in the No. 6 car while Bourdais would return in the No. 7. Bourdais and team continued to dominate at Road and Street courses capturing three podium finishes, including two in the double-header in Toronto. Saavedra finished 21st in points, last among full-time drivers, with two top-10 finishes. In 2014, the team left IndyCar racing to focus on the new Formula E electric powered series.

Formula E
On September 25, 2013, it was announced that Dragon Racing would be joining Formula E with Jay Penske leading the team. Dragon would be the second American team to join as Andretti Autosport had already announced their entry by then.

2014–15 season

In July 2014, Dragon announced Mike Conway as their first driver. Later that month, Jérôme d'Ambrosio was announced as the second driver. Conway would actually not make his debut as his seat was taken over by Oriol Servià, who also got signed back in March 2014. Servià only competed in the first four races however, despite finishing on points in all of them. Loïc Duval then stepped in for the rest of the season, beginning from the 2015 Miami ePrix.

After a very successful second half of the season, Dragon finished second in Teams' Championship with 171 points.

2015–16 season
Dragon decided not to build their own powertrain for the 2015–16 season and instead made a deal with Venturi to supply their VM200-FE-01 powertrains to the team. Dragon did not change their driver lineup from the previous year and continued to use d'Ambrosio and Duval.

After a slight dip in performance, Dragon finished fourth in Teams' Championship with 143 points.

2016–17 season

Prior to the 2016–17 season, Dragon made a deal with Faraday Future, who became the title sponsor of the team and also a technical partner. The partnership would come to a close at the end of 2017. Dragon ended the Venturi partnership and became a manufacturer, developing their own powertrains. The pairing of d'Ambrosio and Duval was once again retained, though Mike Conway, the team's supposed first driver in the 2014–15 season, subbed for Duval at the 2016 Paris ePrix.

As a manufacturer, Dragon fell into eighth place in Teams' Championship, scoring only 33 points with no podium finishes.

2017–18 season
Duval left the team and was replaced by Neel Jani. Jani would only make a single appearance at the 2017 Hong Kong ePrix double-header, with José María López replacing Jani for the rest of the season. The team ran two different liveries simultaneously. for each of their drivers. D'Ambrosio was given a red metallic car while Jani/López ran a white car.

Despite scoring 41 points, which was more than in the previous year, Dragon fell to ninth place in Teams' Championship.

2018–19 season

For the 2018–19 season, the team got rebranded to GEOX Dragon, reflecting the new sponsorship deal with Geox. D'Ambrosio left the team to join Mahindra Racing, which prompted Dragon to promote their reserve driver Maximilian Günther to the empty seat. Prior to the 2019 Mexico City ePrix, Günther was replaced by Felipe Nasr. Günther got back into the seat at the Rome ePrix as Nasr had other commitments. Nasr would never return to Dragon again, however.

Dragon would once again worsen their position as they only scored 23 points, which was enough for tenth place in Teams' Championship.

2019–20 season
In addition to being a manufacturer, Dragon also became the new suppliers of the Nio 333 FE Team. NIO bought the year-old Penske EV-3 powertrains and rebadged them. For the 2019–20 season, Dragon introduced a new driver lineup consisting of Brendon Hartley and Nico Müller. In March 2020, Dragon committed to their manufacturer status for another two seasons. Hartley left the team in July and was replaced by Sérgio Sette Câmara.

Dragon have fallen down to eleventh place in Teams' Championship, scoring just two points with Hartley's P9 finish in the second race of the 2019 Diriyah ePrix.

2020–21 season

In November 2020, Sette Câmara was confirmed as a full-time driver for the upcoming 2020–21 season. The following month, Müller was confirmed as his partner. Dragon would start the season with the Penske EV-4 powertrain from the previous season, only switching to Penske EV-5 at the 2021 Monaco ePrix. In February 2021, Dragon announced a technical partnership with Bosch, who will help develop Dragon's powertrains for the Gen3 era of Formula E.

In the chaotic first race of the Valencia ePrix, Müller scored Dragon's first Gen2 era podium with a second-place finish after many cars had to retire or were disqualified due to running out of energy. For the 2021 Puebla ePrix, Joel Eriksson replaced Müller due to a date clash with his DTM commitments. On July 3, 2021, Müller announced on his Twitter account that he and Dragon decided to part ways, effectively keeping Eriksson in his seat for the rest of the season.

Sponsors

Drivers

Indycar 

 Ryan Briscoe (2007)
 Tomas Scheckter (2008)
 Raphael Matos (2009–2010)
 Patrick Carpentier1 (2011)
 Scott Speed1 (2011)
 Paul Tracy (2011)
 Ho-Pin Tung (2011)
 Katherine Legge (2012)
 Sébastien Bourdais (2012–2013)
 Sebastián Saavedra (2013)

Formula E 

 Oriol Servià (2014-2015)
 Jérôme d'Ambrosio (2014–2018)
 Loïc Duval (2015–2017)
 Mike Conway (2017)
 Neel Jani (2017)
 Maximilian Günther (2018–2019)
 José María López (2018–2019)
 Felipe Nasr (2019)
 Brendon Hartley (2019)
 Nico Müller (2019–2021)
 Sérgio Sette Câmara (2020–2022)
 Joel Eriksson (2021)
 Antonio Giovinazzi (2022)
 Stoffel Vandoorne (2023-present)
 Jean-Éric Vergne (2023-present)

Racing results

Complete Formula E results
(key) (results in bold indicate pole position; results in italics indicate fastest lap)

Notes
  – In the inaugural season, all teams were supplied with a spec powertrain by McLaren.
 † – Driver did not finish the race, but was classified as he completed over 90% of the race distance.

Other teams supplied by Dragon

Notes
  – The powertrain is a rebadged Penske EV-3.

Complete IndyCar Series results
(key)

 With support from Team Penske.
 Non-points-paying, exhibition race.
 The 2011 Las Vegas race was abandoned following a Lap 11 fatal crash that damaged the circuit.  Under INDYCAR rules, 101 of 200 laps had to be completed for a legal race.

Footnotes

References

External links

 Dragon Racing Official Website
Formula E team page
 

2007 establishments in the United States
Formula E teams
Auto racing teams established in 2007